Delsbo is a locality in Hudiksvall Municipality, Gävleborg County, Sweden, with 2,192 inhabitants in 2010. It is situated some 25 kilometers west of Hudiksvall, in the vicinity of the two lakes of Dellen. The town is known for its assembly of musicians at Delsbo Ancient Farm (Delsbo Forngård) every year.

Villages 
Research conducted in 2005 revealed that Delsbo has the highest density of villages in Sweden. Approximately 104 different villages are scattered around the Delsbo community, among them the villages Ava, Johannesberg, Loppet, Långbacka, Norrberg, Norrväna, Oppsjö, Sannäs, Stenbo, Vitterarv and Västanäng. A local newspaper-reporter described Delsbo as a place with "a village behind every tree". The population of the Delsbo villages range from one person to a couple of hundred.

Climate 
Delsbo has a humid continental climate (Dfb). Summers are very warm for the northerly latitude in combination with quite moderate winters, that still retains larger seasonal differences than nearby Hudiksvall.

Dialect 
The local dialect is known as Dellboskan. It is a Norrlandian dialect with some Norwegian attributes.

Examples:
 Hän ä'nt sa ugalin = Det är inte så illa (It isn't (too) bad)
 Dellenbiggda = Dellenbygden (The Dellen area).

Notable natives 
 Johanna Sällström  (actress) (grew up there with her father)
 Jörgen Brink (cross-country skier)
 David Johansson (cross-country skier)
 Thomas Magnusson (cross-country skier)
 Peter Dolving (entrepreneur, artist, writer) (from Skytts at Norrväna. The oldest historical building is from 1640. Interior conservation 80's.)

Sports
The following sports clubs are located in Delsbo:

 Delsbo IF

References

External links 
 Listen to the Delsbo dialect

Populated places in Hudiksvall Municipality
Hälsingland